In microbiology, efflux is the moving of a variety of different compounds out of cells, such as antibiotics, heavy metals, organic pollutants, plant-produced compounds, quorum sensing signals, bacterial metabolites and neurotransmitters. All microorganisms, with a few exceptions, have highly conserved DNA sequences in their genome that encode efflux pumps. Efflux pumps actively move substances out of a microorganism, in a process known as active efflux, which is a vital part of xenobiotic metabolism. This active efflux mechanism is responsible for various types of resistance to bacterial pathogens within bacterial species - the most concerning being antibiotic resistance because microorganisms can have adapted efflux pumps to divert toxins out of the cytoplasm and into extracellular media.

Efflux systems function via an energy-dependent mechanism (active transport) to pump out unwanted toxic substances through specific efflux pumps. Some efflux systems are drug-specific, whereas others may accommodate multiple drugs with small multidrug resistance (SMR) transporters.

Efflux pumps are proteinaceous transporters localized in the cytoplasmic membrane of all kinds of cells. They are active transporters, meaning that they require a source of chemical energy to perform their function. Some are primary active transporters utilizing adenosine triphosphate hydrolysis as a source of energy, whereas others are secondary active transporters (uniporters, symporters, or antiporters) in which transport is coupled to an electrochemical potential difference created by pumping hydrogen or sodium ions into the cell.

Bacterial 

Bacterial efflux transporters are  classified into five major superfamilies, based on their amino acid sequence  and the energy source used to export their substrates:

 The major facilitator superfamily (MFS)
 The ATP-binding cassette superfamily (ABC)
 The small multidrug resistance family (SMR)
 The resistance-nodulation-cell division superfamily (RND)
 The multi antimicrobial extrusion protein family (MATE).

Of these, only the ABC superfamily are primary transporters, the rest being secondary transporters utilizing proton or sodium gradient as a source of energy. Whereas MFS dominates in Gram positive bacteria, the RND family was once thought to be unique to Gram negative bacteria. They have since been found in all major kingdoms.

Structure 
Efflux pumps generally consist of an outer membrane protein, middle periplasmic protein, inner membrane protein, and transmembrane duct. The transmembrane duct is located in the outer membrane of the cell. The duct is also bound to two other proteins: a periplasmic membrane protein and an integral membrane transporter. The periplasmic membrane protein and the inner membrane protein of the system are coupled to control the opening and closing of the duct (channel). When a toxin binds to this inner membrane protein, the inner membrane proteins gives rise to a biochemical cascade that transmits signals to the periplasmic membrane protein and outer membrane protein to open the channel and move the toxin out of the cell. This mechanism uses an energy-dependent, protein-protein interaction that is generated by the transfer of the toxin for an H+ ion by the inner membrane transporter.
The fully assembled in vitro and in vivo structures of AcrAB-TolC pump have been solved by cryoEM and cryoET.

Function 
Although antibiotics are the most clinically important substrates of efflux systems, it is probable that most efflux pumps have other natural physiological functions. Examples include:
 The E. coli AcrAB  efflux system, which has a physiologic role of pumping out bile acids and fatty acids to lower their toxicity.
 The MFS family Ptr pump in Streptomyces pristinaespiralis appears to be an autoimmunity pump for this organism when it turns on production of pristinamycins I and II.
 The AcrAB–TolC system in E. coli is suspected to have a role in the transport of the calcium-channel components in the E. coli membrane.
 The MtrCDE system plays a  protective role by providing resistance to faecal lipids in rectal isolates of Neisseria gonorrhoeae.
 The AcrAB efflux system of Erwinia amylovora  is important for this organism's virulence, plant (host) colonization, and resistance to plant toxins.
 The MexXY component of the MexXY-OprM multidrug efflux system of P. aeruginosa is inducible by antibiotics that target ribosomes via the PA5471 gene product.
 Efflux pumps have also been shown to play a role in biofilm formation. However, the substrates for such pumps, and whether changes in their efflux activity affect biofilm formation directly or indirectly, remain to be determined. 

The ability of efflux systems to recognize a large number of compounds  other than their natural substrates is probably because substrate recognition is based on physicochemical properties, such as hydrophobicity, aromaticity and ionizable character rather than on defined chemical properties, as in classical enzyme-substrate or ligand-receptor recognition. Because most antibiotics are amphiphilic molecules - possessing both hydrophilic and hydrophobic characters - they are easily recognized by many efflux pumps.

Impact on antimicrobial resistance
The impact of efflux mechanisms on antimicrobial resistance is large; this is usually attributed to the following:
 The genetic elements encoding efflux pumps may be encoded on chromosomes and/or plasmids, thus contributing to both intrinsic (natural) and acquired resistance respectively. As an intrinsic mechanism of resistance, efflux pump genes can survive a hostile environment (for example in the presence of antibiotics) which allows for the selection of mutants  that over-express these genes. Being located on transportable genetic elements as plasmids or transposons is also advantageous for the microorganisms as it allows for the easy spread of efflux genes between distant species.
 Antibiotics can act as inducers and regulators of the expression of some efflux pumps.
 Expression of several efflux pumps in a given bacterial species may lead to a broad spectrum of resistance when considering the shared substrates of some multi-drug efflux pumps,  where one efflux pump may confer resistance to a wide range of antimicrobials.

Eukaryotic 

In eukaryotic cells, the existence of efflux pumps has been known since the discovery of P-glycoprotein in 1976 by Juliano and Ling. Efflux pumps are one of the major causes of anticancer drug resistance in eukaryotic cells. They include monocarboxylate transporters (MCTs), multiple drug resistance proteins (MDRs)- also referred as P-glycoprotein, multidrug resistance-associated proteins (MRPs), peptide transporters (PEPTs), and Na+ phosphate transporters (NPTs). These transporters are distributed along particular portions of the renal proximal tubule, intestine, liver, blood–brain barrier, and other portions of the brain.

Inhibitors 
Several trials are currently being conducted to develop drugs that can be co-administered with antibiotics to act as inhibitors for the efflux-mediated extrusion of antibiotics. As yet, no efflux inhibitor has been approved for therapeutic use, but some are being used to determine the prevalence of efflux pumps in clinical isolates and in cell biology research. Verapamil, for example, is used to block P-glycoprotein-mediated efflux of DNA-binding fluorophores, thereby facilitating fluorescent cell sorting for DNA content. Various natural products have been shown to inhibit bacterial efflux pumps including the carotenoids capsanthin and capsorubin, the flavonoids rotenone and chrysin, and the alkaloid lysergol.  Some nanoparticles, for example zinc oxide, also inhibit bacterial efflux pumps.

See also 
 Antibiotic resistance

References 

Membrane biology
Antibiotics